Vidyasagar Nautiyal (29 September 1933 – 12 February 2012) was an Indian politician and leader of Communist Party of India (CPI). He was elected as a member of Uttar Pradesh Legislative Assembly from Devprayag in 1980. He was the president of All India Students' Federation from 1959 to 1965.

References

Communist Party of India politicians from Uttarakhand
1933 births
2012 deaths
Uttar Pradesh MLAs 1980–1985
People from Tehri Garhwal district